is a Japanese politician of the Liberal Democratic Party and a member of the House of Councillors in the Diet (national legislature). After living in Choshi, Chiba and graduating from Nihon University, he was elected to the House of Councillors for the first time in 2002 after serving in the assembly of Chiba Prefecture for four terms.

References

External links 
 Official website in Japanese.

Members of the House of Councillors (Japan)
Living people
1952 births
Liberal Democratic Party (Japan) politicians
Nihon University alumni